Chaux may refer to:

Places
 in France
Chaux, Côte-d'Or, a commune in the department of Côte-d'Or
Chaux, Territoire de Belfort, commune in the department of Territoire de Belfort
The Forest of Chaux, Franche-Comté, the second largest forest in France
 Chaux, an ideal city near the Forest of Chaux proposed by Claude-Nicolas Ledoux (1736-1806)
Chaux-Champagny, commune in the department of Jura
Chaux-des-Crotenay, commune in the department of Jura
Chaux-des-Prés, commune in the department of Jura
Chaux-la-Lotière, commune in the department of Haute-Saône
Chaux-lès-Clerval, commune in the department of Doubs
Chaux-lès-Passavant, commune in the department of Doubs
Chaux-lès-Port, commune in the department of Haute-Saône
Chaux-Neuve, commune in the department of Doubs
 in Switzerland
 Chaux (Cossonay)
 Chaux des Breuleux
 Chaux du Milieu
 Chaux Ronde, a mountain in the western Bernese Alps, overlooking Villars-sur-Ollon in the canton of Vaud

People
 Víctor Mosquera Chaux (1919–1997), Colombian lawyer and politician who, as Presidential Designate, served as interim President of Colombia for 8 days in February, 1981

See also
 La Chaux (disambiguation)